Holocausto may refer to:

 The Holocaust, in several languages
 Holocausto (band), music band from Brazil
 Holocausto, the former stage name of Polish musician Adam Darski

See also
 Holocaust (disambiguation)